This is a list of appearances made by Donald Duck in Disney features and cartoons.

Theatrical animated shorts

1930s

1934
 The Wise Little Hen, released on June 9, 1934 – in a Silly Symphony cartoon
 Orphan's Benefit, released on August 11, 1934 – in a Mickey Mouse cartoon, also remade and released on August 22, 1941, first cartoon to be produced to feature Donald Duck
 The Dognapper, released on November 17, 1934 – in a Mickey Mouse cartoon

1935
 The Band Concert, released on February 23, 1935 – in a Mickey Mouse cartoon
 Mickey's Service Station, released on March 16, 1935 – in a Mickey Mouse cartoon
 Mickey's Fire Brigade, released on August 3, 1935 – in a Mickey Mouse cartoon
 On Ice, released on September 28, 1935 – in a Mickey Mouse cartoon

1936
 Mickey's Polo Team, released on January 4, 1936 – in a Mickey Mouse cartoon
 Orphans' Picnic, released on February 15, 1936 – in a Mickey Mouse cartoon
 Mickey's Grand Opera, released on March 7, 1936 – in a Mickey Mouse cartoon. Last appearance of Donald in his original design.
 Moving Day, released on June 20, 1936 – in a Mickey Mouse cartoon. First appearance of Donald in his modern form.
 Alpine Climbers, released on July 25, 1936 – in a Mickey Mouse cartoon
 Mickey's Circus, released on August 1, 1936 – in a Mickey Mouse cartoon
 Donald and Pluto, released on September 12, 1936 – in a Mickey Mouse cartoon

1937
 Don Donald, released on January 9, 1937 - first Donald Duck series cartoon
 Magician Mickey, released on February 6, 1937 – in a Mickey Mouse cartoon
 Moose Hunters, released on February 20, 1937 – in a Mickey Mouse cartoon
 Mickey's Amateurs, released on April 17, 1937 – in a Mickey Mouse cartoon
 Modern Inventions, released on May 29, 1937 – the last Disney cartoon released through United Artists
 Hawaiian Holiday, released on September 24, 1937 – in a Mickey Mouse cartoon
 Clock Cleaners, released on October 15, 1937 – in a Mickey Mouse cartoon
 Donald's Ostrich, released on December 10, 1937
 Lonesome Ghosts, released on December 24, 1937 – in a Mickey Mouse cartoon

1938
 Self Control, released on February 11, 1938
 Boat Builders, released on February 25, 1938 – in a Mickey Mouse cartoon
 Donald's Better Self, released on March 11, 1938
 Donald's Nephews, released on April 15, 1938, first screen appearance of Donald's three nephews, Huey, Dewey, and Louie
 Mickey's Trailer, released on May 6, 1938 – in a Mickey Mouse cartoon
 Polar Trappers, released on June 17, 1938 – in a Donald & Goofy cartoon
 Good Scouts, released on July 8, 1938
 The Fox Hunt, released on July 29, 1938 – in a Donald & Goofy cartoon
 The Whalers, released on August 19, 1938 – in a Mickey Mouse cartoon
 Donald's Golf Game, released on November 4, 1938
 Mother Goose Goes Hollywood, released on December 23, 1938 – cameo, in a Silly Symphony cartoon

1939
 Donald's Lucky Day, released on January 13, 1939
 The Hockey Champ, released on April 28, 1939
 Donald's Cousin Gus, released on May 19, 1939, Gus's first appearance
 Beach Picnic, released on June 9, 1939 – in a Donald and Pluto cartoon
 Sea Scouts, released on June 30, 1939
 Donald's Penguin, released on August 11, 1939
 The Autograph Hound, released on September 1, 1939
 The Standard Parade, released on September 30, 1939 – cameo, in a Mickey Mouse cartoon
 Officer Duck, released on October 10, 1939

1940s

1940
 The Riveter, released on March 15, 1940
 Donald's Dog Laundry, released on April 5, 1940 – in a Donald and Pluto cartoon
 Tugboat Mickey, released on April 26, 1940 – in a Mickey Mouse cartoon
 Billposters, released on May 17, 1940 – in a Donald & Goofy cartoon
 Mr. Duck Steps Out, released on June 7, 1940, first appearance of Daisy Duck
 Put-Put Troubles, released on July 19, 1940 – in a Donald and Pluto cartoon
 Donald's Vacation, released on August 9, 1940
 The Volunteer Worker, released on September 1, 1940. Propaganda film, not an official Donald cartoon.
 Window Cleaners, released on September 20, 1940 – in a Donald and Pluto cartoon
 Fire Chief, released on December 13, 1940

1941
 Timber, released on January 10, 1941
 Golden Eggs, released on March 7, 1941
 A Good Time for a Dime, released on May 9, 1941
 The Nifty Nineties, released on June 20, 1941 – cameo, in a Mickey Mouse cartoon
 Early to Bed, released July 11, 1941
 Truant Officer Donald, released on August 1, 1941
 Orphan's Benefit, released on August 22, 1941 – in a Mickey Mouse Cartoon, remake of version released on August 11, 1934
 Old MacDonald Duck, released on September 12, 1941
 Donald's Camera, released on October 24, 1941
 Chef Donald, released on December 5, 1941

1942
 Donald's Decision, released on January 11, 1942. - World War II Propaganda film
 All Together, released on January 13, 1942 – World War II Propaganda film
 The Village Smithy, released on January 16, 1942
 The New Spirit, released on January 23, 1942 - World War II Propaganda film
 Mickey's Birthday Party, released on February 7, 1942 – in a Mickey Mouse cartoon
 Symphony Hour, released on March 20, 1942 – in a Mickey Mouse cartoon
 Donald's Snow Fight, released on April 10, 1942
 Donald Gets Drafted, released on May 1, 1942
 Donald's Garden, released on June 12, 1942
 Donald's Gold Mine, released on July 24, 1942
 The Vanishing Private, released on September 25, 1942
 Sky Trooper, released on November 6, 1942
 Bellboy Donald, released on December 18, 1942

1943
 Der Fuehrer's Face, released on January 1, 1943 - World War II anti-Nazi propaganda film; Oscar winner
 The Spirit of '43, released on January 7, 1943. World War II propaganda film
 Donald's Tire Trouble, released on January 29, 1943
 Lake Titicaca, released on February 6, 1943, segment of Saludos Amigos
 Aquarela do Brasil, released on February 6, 1943, segment of Saludos Amigos
 The Flying Jalopy, released on March 12, 1943
 Fall Out Fall In, released on April 23, 1943
 The Old Army Game, released on November 5, 1943
 Home Defense, released on November 26, 1943

1944
 Trombone Trouble, released on February 18, 1944
 Donald Duck and the Gorilla, released on March 31, 1944
 Contrary Condor, released on April 21, 1944
 Commando Duck, released on June 2, 1944
 The Plastics Inventor, released on September 1, 1944
 Donald's Off Day, released on December 8, 1944

1945
 The Clock Watcher, released on January 26, 1945
 The Three Caballeros, released on February 3, 1945 – in a Donald Duck, Jose Carioca & Panchito Pistoles movie
 The Eyes Have It, released on March 30, 1945 – in a Donald and Pluto cartoon; final Disney short animated by Don Patterson and only short to have his on-screen credit
 Donald's Crime, released on June 29, 1945
 Duck Pimples, released on August 10, 1945
 No Sail, released on September 7, 1945 – in a Donald & Goofy cartoon
 Cured Duck, released on October 26, 1945
 Old Sequoia, released on December 21, 1945

1946
 Donald's Double Trouble, released on June 28, 1946
 Wet Paint, released on August 9, 1946
 Dumb Bell of the Yukon, released on August 30, 1946
 Lighthouse Keeping, released on September 20, 1946
 Frank Duck Brings 'Em Back Alive, released on November 1, 1946 – in a Donald & Goofy cartoon

1947
 Straight Shooters, released on April 18, 1947
 Sleepy Time Donald, released on May 9, 1947
 Clown of the Jungle, released on June 20, 1947
 Donald's Dilemma, released on July 11, 1947
 Crazy with the Heat, released on August 1, 1947 – in a Donald & Goofy cartoon
 Bootle Beetle, released on August 22, 1947
 Wide Open Spaces, released on September 12, 1947
 Mickey and the Beanstalk, released on September 27, 1947 – segment of Fun and Fancy Free
 Chip an' Dale, released on November 28, 1947

1948
 Drip Dippy Donald, released on March 5, 1948
 Daddy Duck, released on April 16, 1948
 Donald's Dream Voice, released on May 21, 1948
 Blame It On The Samba, released on May 27, 1948, segment of Melody Time
 The Trial of Donald Duck, released on July 30, 1948
 Inferior Decorator, released on August 27, 1948
 Soup's On, released on October 15, 1948
 Three for Breakfast, released on November 5, 1948
 Tea for Two Hundred, released on December 24, 1948

1949
 Donald's Happy Birthday, released on February 11, 1949
 Sea Salts, released on April 8, 1949
 Winter Storage, released on June 3, 1949
 Honey Harvester, released on August 5, 1949
 All in a Nutshell, released on September 2, 1949
 The Greener Yard, released on October 14, 1949
 Slide, Donald, Slide, released on November 25, 1949
 Toy Tinkers, released on December 16, 1949

1950s

1950
 Lion Around, released on January 20, 1950
 Crazy Over Daisy, released on March 18, 1950
 Trailer Horn, released on April 28, 1950
 Hook, Lion and Sinker, released on September 1, 1950
 Bee at the Beach, released on October 13, 1950
 Out on a Limb, released on December 15, 1950

1951
 Dude Duck, released on March 2, 1951
 Corn Chips, released on March 23, 1951
 Test Pilot Donald, released on June 8, 1951
 Lucky Number, released on July 20, 1951
 Out of Scale, released on November 2, 1951
 Bee on Guard, released on December 14, 1951

1952
 Donald Applecore, released on January 18, 1952
 Let's Stick Together, released on April 25, 1952
 Uncle Donald's Ants, released on July 18, 1952
 Trick or Treat, released on October 10, 1952
 Pluto's Christmas Tree, released on November 21, 1952 (cameo) – in a Mickey Mouse cartoon

1953
 Don's Fountain of Youth, released on May 30, 1953
 The New Neighbor, released on August 1, 1953
 Rugged Bear, released on October 23, 1953
 Working for Peanuts, released on November 11, 1953
 Canvas Back Duck, released on December 25, 1953

1954
 Spare the Rod, released on January 15, 1954
 Donald's Diary, released on February 13, 1954 - Final Donald & Daisy cartoon
 Dragon Around, released on July 16, 1954
 Grin and Bear It, released on August 13, 1954
 The Flying Squirrel, released on November 12, 1954
 Grand Canyonscope, released on December 23, 1954 - the first Disney film to be distributed by Buena Vista Distribution alongside 20,000 Leagues Under the Sea

1955
 No Hunting, released on January 14, 1955
 Bearly Asleep, released on August 19, 1955
 Beezy Bear, released on September 2, 1955
 Up a Tree, released on September 23, 1955

1956
 Chips Ahoy, released on February 24, 1956 - the final Donald Duck cartoon to be distributed by RKO Radio Pictures
 How to Have an Accident in the Home, released on July 8, 1956

1959
 Donald in Mathmagic Land, released on June 26, 1959 (educational)
 How to Have an Accident at Work, released on September 2, 1959

1960s
 Donald and the Wheel, released on June 21, 1961 (educational)
 The Litterbug, released on June 21, 1961  (educational)
 Steel & America, 1965 (commercial)
 Donald's Fire Survival Plan, May 5, 1966 (educational)
 Family Planning, December 1, 1967 (educational, "Planificacion Familiar", produced for the U.S. Population Council and distributed by Asociación Chilena de Protección de la Familia, an affiliate of Planned Parenthood)

1980s
 Mickey's Christmas Carol, released on December 16, 1983
 Who Framed Roger Rabbit, released on June 22, 1988 (cameo)

1990s
 The Prince and the Pauper, released on November 16, 1990
 A Goofy Movie, released on April 7, 1995 (cameo)
 Noah's Ark, the segment of Fantasia 2000 released on December 17, 1999

2000s
 Mickey's PhilharMagic, 3D theme park attraction. First opened in 2003.

Disney home entertainment
Note: These are films that were originally released straight to VHS or DVD.
 Stuck on Christmas, a segment of Mickey's Once Upon a Christmas - released on December 7, 1999
 Mickey's Magical Christmas: Snowed in at the House of Mouse- released in 2001 - Compilation film
 Mickey's House of Villains - released in 2002 - Compilation Film
 Belles on Ice, a segment of Mickey's Twice Upon a Christmas - released in 2004 - CGI
 Christmas: Impossible, a segment of Mickey's Twice Upon a Christmas - released in 2004 - CGI
 Donald's Gift, a segment of Mickey's Twice Upon a Christmas - released in 2004 - CGI; final cartoon starring Donald
 Mickey's Dog-Gone Christmas, a segment of Mickey's Twice Upon a Christmas - released in 2004 - CGI
 Mickey, Donald, Goofy: The Three Musketeers - released in 2004

Television

1950s–1960s
Disneyland
 The Donald Duck Story (1954)
 A Day in the Life of Donald Duck (1956)
 On Vacation (1956)
 Where Do Stories Comes From (1956)
 The Plausible Impossible (1956)
 At Home with Donald Duck (1956)
 Your Host, Donald Duck (1956)
 Donald's Award (1957)
 Duck for Hire (1957)
 Mars and Beyond, aired on December 4, 1957 (cameo)
 Donald's Weekend (1958),
 Four Tales On A Mouse (1958),
 Duck Files Coop (1959)
 The Adventures of Chip 'n' Dale (1959)
 Highway to Trouble (1959)
 Two Happy Amigos (1960)
 This is Your Life, Donald Duck (1960)
 The Mad Hermit Of Chimney Butte (1960)
 Donald's Silver Anniversary (1960)

1980s
 DuckTales (1987–1990, as recurring guest)

1990s
 Bonkers (1993–1994, cameo)
 Quack Pack (1996)
 Mickey Mouse Works (1999–2000)
 Donald's Failed Fourth, aired on May 1, 1999 (with Daisy Duck)
 Donald's Shell Shots, aired on May 8, 1999
 Donald's Rocket Ruckus, aired on May 22, 1999
 Donald's Valentine Dollar, aired on May 29, 1999
 Donald on Ice, aired on September 11, 1999
 Donald's Dinner Date, aired on September 18, 1999
 Donald and The Big Nut, aired on October 3, 1999
 Donald's Dynamite : Snowman, aired on November 7, 1999
 Donald's Grizzly Guest, aired on November 7, 1999
 Computer.Don, released on January 1, 2000
 Survival of the Woodchucks, released on February 5, 2000
 Donald's Halloween Scare, released on March 4, 2000
 Donald's Lighthouse, released on March 4, 2000
 Domesticated Donald, released on March 16, 2000
 Donald's Fish Fry, released on September 23, 2000
 Bird Brained Donald, released on October 7, 2000

2000s
 House of Mouse (2001–2003)
 Donald's Charmed Date, released on January 27, 2001
 Golf Nut Donald, released on February 17, 2001
 Music Store Donald, released on February 17, 2001
 Donald's Goofy World, released on March 10, 2001
 Mickey and the Color Caper, released on January 26, 2002, as "A Mickey, Donald and Goofy Cartoon"
 Housesitters, released on September 2, 2002, as "A Mickey, Donald and Goofy Cartoon"
 Mickey Mouse Clubhouse (2006–2016) in 3D CGI

2010s
 Mickey Mouse (2013–2019)
 Mickey and the Roadster Racers/Mickey Mouse Mixed-Up Adventures (2017–2021)
 DuckTales (2017–2021)
 Legend of the Three Caballeros (2018)
 Mickey Go Local (2019)

2020s
 The Wonderful World of Mickey Mouse (2020–present)
 Mickey Mouse Funhouse (2021–present)
 Chip 'n' Dale: Park Life (2021–present)
 Mickey's Tale of Two Witches (2021)
 Mickey and Minnie Wish Upon a Christmas (2021)
 Mickey Saves Christmas (2022)

See also
Donald Duck (film series)

References

Film series introduced in 1934
Lists of animated films by character

Disney-related lists